Trappers Lake, elevation , is a lake in the Flat Tops Wilderness Area, which is in the White River National Forest in Colorado, United States.  It is located in Garfield County east of the town of Meeker and west of the town of Yampa.  The lake is roughly a mile and a half (2.4 km) long and half a mile (800 m) wide reaching depths of 180 feet (55 m).  It is surrounded by the Flat Tops Mountains, the most striking of which is the large semicircular Amphitheater which has a height of 1,650 ft (503m). Trappers Lake is the second-largest natural lake in Colorado after Grand Lake.

There is a large camping area and lodge near the lake.  Trappers Lake is an excellent fishing lake for cutthroat trout.  All Cutthroat trout regardless of size must be released when caught, but you can keep brook trout (according to signage around the lake as of June 2014).  Only artificial flies and lures are permitted.  No motorized boats are allowed.  About  of forest surrounding the lake were burned by the Big Fish wildfire, started by lightning, in July 2002.

The area around the lake was put largely off limits to development in 1920, due to the recommendation of Arthur Carhart, hired by the Forest Service to make a survey for a road around the lake. It was the first such Forest Service property to be set aside in this manner. Because of this, some have considered it the birthplace of the U.S. Wilderness Area system.

See also
List of lakes in Colorado
List of U.S. Wilderness Areas in Colorado

References

External links

Colorado Fishing
Colorado Wilderness website
Google Maps Satellite Image

Bodies of water of Garfield County, Colorado
Lakes of Colorado
White River National Forest